Rakops Airport  is an airport serving the village of Rakops, Botswana.

References